FNZ (also known as Finatik N Zac) are Grammy award-winning  Australian record production and songwriting duo composed of Michael "Finatik" Mule and Isaac "Zac" De Boni.

Production credits 

Notes
  signifies songwriting credit only

References

External links 
https://www.instagram.com/fnz_/
https://www.complex.com/music/2019/06/fnz-australian-producers-denzel-curry-finatik-n-zac/
https://pitchfork.com/reviews/albums/denzel-curry-zuu/

Australian musical duos
Songwriting teams
Record production duos
Hip hop duos
Pop-rap groups